Hotel Principe di Savoia, also known as "The Principe", is a five-star luxury hotel in Milan, Italy. The hotel has long been one of Milan's landmarks. Given the name "Principe e Savoia" in 1927, a time when Milan had already established its position as the financial center of the country, it soon became a home for businessmen. 

In 2003, the hotel became part of the Dorchester Collection, a group of luxury hotels owned by the Brunei Investment Agency. Located on Piazza della Repubblica, The Principe houses 301 rooms with 44 suites, on ten floors.

History
The hotel originally opened in April 1927 as the Principe e Savoia, developed by S.A. Acquisto ed Esercizio Alberghi Savoia. Its neoclassical architectural design was developed by Milanese architect Cesare Tenca. Following the Great Depression in the 1930s, the hotel was acquired by CIGA Hotels Group in 1938, which also managed hotels including the Danieli and Gritti Palace in Venice.

During World War II, Principe became a headquarters for the Germans, and later it was used as an American headquarters. The hotel, which was not badly damaged during the war and underwent renovations in the 1950s, adding two wings: Principe Rosso and Metallico.

In the 1980s, CIGA renamed the hotel "Principe di Savoia", the proper way to refer to the Italian royal family, the House of Savoy, for which the hotel is named. Starwood bought a controlling interest in CIGA Hotels in 1994.

In 2003, the hotel was purchased from Starwood by the Dorchester Collection, joining a group of five-star hotels that also includes hotels such as The Dorchester, Plaza Athénée, and Hôtel Meurice.

Overview

Principe di Savoia is located close to Garibaldi, Centrale, and Cadorna stations, as well as the La Scala theatre. The hotel features classic Italian and art deco furniture, statues and decor throughout the building. The entrance showcases a stained-glass domed ceiling while mosaics and chandeliers decorate common areas and guest rooms.
The famed Presidential Suite, located on the tenth floor, features luxurious amenities including a Pompeii style private spa with fresco walls, Turkish bath, antique furniture and fireplace, three bedrooms, full dining room, library and terrace. Guests that have stayed in the suite included Queen Elizabeth II, Prince Philip, Duke of Edinburgh, Woody Allen, President George H. W. Bush, Bill Gates, President Vladimir Putin and more.

The Principe has two restaurants and the Principe Bar renovated in 2009 by architect Thierry Despont. Il Salotto is a casual lobby lounge, while Acanto is the hotel’s fine-dining restaurant headed by executive chef Fabrizio Cadei. Club 10 is a 1,000 square meter fitness and beauty centre located on the top floor of the hotel. It includes a full salon, indoor heated pool, sauna and other amenities.

Notable guests
Since its opening, Principe di Savoia has been known to host notable guests and celebrities such as Edward VIII, Erich Maria Remarque, Aristotle Onassis, Evita Peron, Maria Callas, Charlie Chaplin, Josephine Baker, The Aga Khan, David Rockefeller, Elizabeth Taylor, Henry Ford and the Prince of Monaco.

Other notable guests of the hotel have included Madonna, George Clooney and David and Victoria Beckham.

References

External links
 

Hospitality companies of Italy
Hotels in Milan
Tourist attractions in Milan
Buildings and structures completed in 1927
Hotels established in 1927
Hotel buildings completed in 1927